ACB may refer to:

People 
 Amy Coney Barrett, Associate Justice of the United States Supreme Court

Banking 
 African Central Bank, one of the three financial institutions of the African Union
 Asia Commercial Bank, a commercial bank in Vietnam

Organizations 
 American Council of the Blind, a nationwide organization in the US
 Anti-Corruption Bureau, Andhra Pradesh, India
 ASEAN Centre for Biodiversity an intergovernmental organization
 Association for Clinical Biochemistry and Laboratory Medicine, the British professional body for clinical biochemists, a member of the Science Council
 Aurora Cannabis, whose stock is publicly traded under the ticker symbol ACB
 Australian Classification Board, Australia's statutory censorship and classification body

Sports 

 Afghanistan Cricket Board, the governing body for professional and amateur cricket in Afghanistan
 Asociación de Clubs de Baloncesto, governing body of principal basketball league in Spain
 Absolute Championship Berkut, a mixed martial arts, kickboxing, and Brazilian jiu-jitsu promotion based in Russia
 Liga ACB, the top professional basketball division of the Spanish basketball league system (website acb.com)
 Australian Cricket Board, the management for all international and domestic cricket in Australia (the board also manages the Australian Mens and Australian Womens team)

Other uses 
 Adjusted cost base, to calculate the cost of an investment for tax purposes
 Airport City Belgrade
 Amphibious Construction Battalion of the US Navy
 Aortocoronary bypass, a medical procedure 
 Air circuit breaker
 Acton Bridge railway station, Cheshire, England, National Rail station code
 T Áncá language of Nigeria, which may be the same as the Manta language of Cameroon (ISO 639-3 code acb)
 Antrim County Airport, Bellaire, Michigan, US, IATA code